Prometheus of the Island, also known in English as Prometheus from the island of Viševica, is a 1964 Yugoslav film directed by Vatroslav Mimica.

It won the Big Golden Arena for Best Film at the 1965 Pula Film Festival (shared with Aleksandar Petrović's film Three). The film was also entered into the 4th Moscow International Film Festival winning a Special Diploma.

References

External links
 

Prometej s otoka Viševice at hrfilm.hr 

1964 films
Croatian drama films
1964 drama films
Serbo-Croatian-language films
Films directed by Vatroslav Mimica
Jadran Film films
Films set on islands
Films set in the Mediterranean Sea
Croatian black-and-white films
Yugoslav drama films